Michael Blakey may refer to:

 Michael Blakey (anthropologist) (born 1953), American professor at the College of William & Mary
 Michael Robert Blakey (born 1975), British business angel and venture capitalist